Dan Studney (born January 30, 1941) is an American former track and field athlete who competed in the javelin throw. His greatest achievement was a gold medal for the United States at the 1963 Pan American Games.

While competing, he was part of the Santa Clara Valley Youth Village club. He attended San Jose State University and under the tutelage of coach Bert Bonanno he was part of the San Jose State Spartans collegiate team.

Studney originally hailed from Hillside, New Jersey and graduated from Hillside High School in 1959, where he competed in football and wrestling, in addition to track and field.

See also
List of Pan American Games medalists in athletics (men)

References

Living people
1941 births
Sportspeople from Union County, New Jersey
Track and field athletes from New Jersey
Track and field athletes from San Jose, California
American male javelin throwers
Pan American Games gold medalists for the United States
Hillside High School (New Jersey) alumni
People from Hillside, New Jersey
Athletes (track and field) at the 1963 Pan American Games
San Jose State Spartans men's track and field athletes
Pan American Games medalists in athletics (track and field)
Medalists at the 1963 Pan American Games